The 1973 Peachtree Corners Classic – Singles was an event of the 1973 Peachtree Corners Classic men's tennis tournament that was played at the Alexander Memorial Coliseum in Atlanta, Georgia in the United States from March 19 through March 25, 1973. The draw comprised 32 players and 12 were seeded. Tom Okker was the defending champion, but did not compete in this edition. Second-seeded Stan Smith won the singles title, defeating first-seeded Rod Laver in the final, 6–3, 6–4.

Seeds

Draw

Finals

Top half

Bottom half

References

External links
 ITF tournament edition details

Peachtree Corners Classic